The 1984 Arab Junior Athletics Championships was the inaugural edition of the international athletics competition for under-20 athletes from Arab countries. It took place in Casablanca, Morocco from 21–23 July. A total of 38 athletics events were contested, 22 for men and 16 for women. The competition was scheduled to be held in the years between the biennial Arab Athletics Championships for senior athletes.

The junior programme featured two unusual variations in a 30 km road race and a 15 km road walk. No other junior championship has featured these distances. Similar to the European Athletics Junior Championships, the steeplechase was contested over a distance of 2000 m, as opposed to the usual 3000 m at senior events. The establishment of the Arab Junior Championships pre-dated both the Asian Junior Athletics Championships and the African Junior Athletics Championships, as well as the World Junior Championships in Athletics, making it the first competition of its type for the countries involved.

The hosts, Morocco, topped the table with eleven gold medals, nine of them from the women's section. Algeria was second, with eight gold medals, and Tunisia rounded out the top three with seven golds. Several athletes achieved individual doubles. Mustapha Kamel Selmi completed a men's sprint double and was later a 1988 Olympian. Ahmed Ibrahim Warsama won a long-distance double and would go on to win many senior medals in senior Asian competition. Fadhel Khayati won both men's hurdles events and went on to represent Tunisia at the 1992 Olympics. On the women's side, Yasmina Azzizi established herself with a heptathlon/100 metres hurdles double; she dominated the former event at regional level later in the decade. Middle-distance doubles were achieved in both the men's and women's sides, but the winners Sabih Ayman and Mounir Allaoui, were not successful at senior level.

The event was part of a flourish of athletics championships in the mid-1980s in Casablanca, Morocco's largest city. The 1983 Maghreb Athletics Championships and Mediterranean Games were held there the previous year, and the 1985 Pan Arab Games came the year after.

Medal summary

Men

Women

Medal table

References

Arab Junior Athletics Championships
International athletics competitions hosted by Morocco
Sport in Casablanca
Arab Junior Athletics Championships
Arab Junior Athletics Championships
20th century in Casablanca
1984 in youth sport